Parmukh Singh Hoogan (born 7 December 1955) is a Tanzanian politician who served as the member of parliament for the Kikwajuni constituency in the Tanzanian Parliament from 2000 to 2010.

References

1955 births
Living people
Chama Cha Mapinduzi MPs
Tanzanian politicians of Indian descent
Tanzanian MPs 2000–2005
Tanzanian MPs 2005–2010
Tanzanian Sikhs
Tanzanian people of Punjabi descent